Marianne Rørvik (born 2 August 1983) is a Norwegian curler from Oslo. She is the skip of the Norwegian national women's team.

Rørvik has played in nine straight (1997–2005) World Junior Curling Championships, winning gold in 2004 playing third for Linn Githmark.  In 2002, she was added as an alternate player on the Dordi Nordby rink. In 2005, she played second for the team, which included a trip to the 2006 Winter Olympics and a fourth-place finish. In 2006, she was promoted as the team's third, and finally with the retirement of Nordby in 2008, she got to skip the national team.

Personal life
Rørvik is in a relationship with fellow curler Torger Nergård and is mother of two children Karine (b. 2010) & Thale (b. 2013). She works as a senior advisor at Norwegian Water Sources and Energy.

References

External links
 

Curlers at the 2006 Winter Olympics
Olympic curlers of Norway
Norwegian female curlers
Living people
1983 births
Universiade medalists in curling
Universiade bronze medalists for Norway
Medalists at the 2003 Winter Universiade
Sportspeople from Oslo
21st-century Norwegian women